Manabendra Sharma Girls' College, established in 1984, is a general degree women's college situated at Rangia, in Kamrup district, Assam. This college is affiliated with the Gauhati University. This college offers different bachelor's degree courses in arts.

References

External links
http://msgcollege.ac.in/

Women's universities and colleges in Assam
Colleges affiliated to Gauhati University
Educational institutions established in 1984
1984 establishments in Assam